Fiona Victory (born 1952) is an Irish actress.

Her television roles include: Louise Daly in Bracken (1980), Harriet Wright in Shine on Harvey Moon (1982), Maeve Phelan in The Hanging Gale (1995) and Dr Annie Robbins in Dangerfield (1997). She has also appeared in the films Return to Oz (1985) and Swept from the Sea (1997).

In 1990, Victory won the Best Actress award at the Dublin Theatre Festival, for her portrayal of Kitty O'Shea in the play of the same name at the Peacock Theatre.

Personal life
Fiona Victory is the daughter of the Irish composer Gerard Victory, who was Head of Music for Raidió Teilifís Éireann.

She is married to the Scottish actor Kenneth Cranham and they have one daughter, Kathleen.

Filmography

Film

Television

References

External links

1952 births
Living people
Irish television actresses
Place of birth missing (living people)
Irish film actresses
Irish stage actresses